The Sunset Tree is the ninth studio album by the Mountain Goats, released on April 26, 2005 by 4AD. The album's songs revolve around the house John Darnielle grew up in and the people who lived there, including his mother, sister, stepfather, friends, and enemies.

Notes
While We Shall All Be Healed focused on Darnielle's years as a teenager involved with other methamphetamine users, The Sunset Tree focuses on his childhood, and a recurring theme is domestic violence.  The album title refers to a scene in Samuel Butler's The Way of All Flesh in which the character Theobald beats his son Ernest for being unable to pronounce a hard C when singing a hymn. The hymn, "The Tyrolese Evening Hymn," begins with the lines "Come, come, come, Come to the sunset tree."

In the album's liner notes, Darnielle writes: 

"Made possible by my stepfather, Mike Noonan (1940–2004): may the peace which eluded you in life be yours now
Dedicated to any young men and women anywhere who live with people who abuse them, with the following good news:
you are going to make it out of there alive
you will live to tell your story
never lose hope"

Many lyrics reference Darnielle's abusive childhood, especially in the songs "This Year," "Dance Music," and "Hast Thou Considered the Tetrapod." The tone of the album is somber, dealing with Darnielle's longing for escape and his feelings of powerlessness, building up to the song "Lion's Teeth," which Darnielle has described as a "revenge fantasy" in an introduction to a live performance of the song.

The album concludes with the two final songs "Love, Love, Love," in which Darnielle notes the virtue and folly of doing things for reasons of love, and "Pale Green Things," in which he recalls a time his stepfather took him out to watch horses at a racetrack. Darnielle closes the song and the album with a lyric about his sister calling him to inform him of his stepfather's death.

Reception

The Sunset Tree has a metascore of 83 on Metacritic based on 28 reviews, which indicates "universal acclaim." Pitchfork placed The Sunset Tree at number 102 on their list of top 200 albums of the 2000s.

In 2010, the Art Of Time Ensemble featuring (former Barenaked Ladies singer) Steven Page covered "Lion's Teeth" for their record A Singer Must Die.

Track listing

Personnel
John Darnielle – vocals, guitar
Peter Hughes – bass, backing vocals
Erik Friedlander – cello
Alex Decarville – drums
Franklin Bruno – piano
John Vanderslice – production
Scott Solter – engineering
Aaron Prellwitz – engineering
Timin Murray – engineering

References

External links
 "Listening Party" - interview with John Darnielle about the release of The Sunset Tree
 
 

2005 albums
The Mountain Goats albums
4AD albums
Concept albums